How to Be a Cat is a 2013 children's picture book by Nikki McClure. It is about a kitten learning kitty skills from a cat.

Reception
The School Library Journal, in its review of How to Be a Cat, wrote "Boldly rendered black-and-white images offer the perfect background for the large, pale blue font of the text, which consists solely of verbs, and the butterfly that flits its way through the pages with the kitten in pursuit.". Booklist found it "Spare, with the feel of an art book, this gracefully illustrates the parent-child relationship."

How to Be a Cat has also been reviewed by 
Kirkus Reviews, Publishers Weekly, Horn Book Guides, The Deakin Review of Children's Literature, The Bulletin of the Center for Children's Books, and the Washington Missourian.

References

External links

Library holdings of How to Be a Cat

2013 children's books
American picture books
Books about cats